The 2019 Indian general elections was held in seven phases from 11 April to 19 May 2019 to constitute the 17th Lok Sabha. The general election in Puducherry was held on April 18, 2019. The UPA, fielded V. Vaithilingam, of the Indian National Congress, while the National Democratic Alliance fielded AINRC candidate Dr. K. Narayanasamy. Makkal Needhi Maiam fielded Dr. M. A. S. Subramanian and Naam Tamilar Katchi fielded N. Sharmila Beham.

Candidates

Results

Detailed Results

Assembly Segment Wise Lead

References

Elections in Puducherry
Puducherry
2010s in Puducherry